The 26th District Police and Patrol Station is a historic police station in the Kensington neighborhood of Philadelphia, Pennsylvania. It was designed by architect John T. Windrim (1866-1934) and built in 1896.  It and is a three-story, "L"-plan, brownstone and brick building in the Renaissance style.  It features a monumental arched entrance with terra cotta decorative elements, curved corner, copper entablature, wide frieze, and pitched roof.  It housed a police station until 1969.

It was added to the National Register of Historic Places in 1984.

It currently (Sep 2017) houses a branch of The Philadelphia Federal Credit Union.

References

External links
Listing at Philadelphia Architects and Buildings

Government buildings on the National Register of Historic Places in Philadelphia
Renaissance Revival architecture in Pennsylvania
Government buildings completed in 1896
Kensington, Philadelphia